HMS Child's Play was a 24-gun French privateer, Le Jeux of St Malo taken by HMS Tartar on 7 June 1706. She was purchased on 6 July 1706. She was commissioned into the Royal Navy on 10 July 1706 for service in the West Indies. She was wrecked in a hurricane in 1707.

Child's Play was the only named vessel in the Royal Navy.

Specifications
She was captured on 7 June 1706 and purchased on 6 July 1706. Her tonnage calculation was  tons. Her armament was twenty-six 6-pounders on the upper deck with and four 3-pounders on the quarterdeck all on wooden trucks.

Commissioned service
She was commissioned on 10 July 1706 under the command of Captain George Doyley, RN for service in the West Indies. Captain Doyley drowned when the ship was lost.

Loss
She was wrecked in a hurricane on Palmetto Point, St Kitts on 30 August 1707.

Citations

References
 Winfield, British Warships in the Age of Sail (1603 – 1714), by Rif Winfield, published by Seaforth Publishing, England © 2009, EPUB , Chapter 6, The Sixth Rates, Vessels acquired from 18 December 1688, Sixth Rates of 20 guns and up to 26 guns, Ex-French Prizes (1704–09), Child's Play
 Colledge, Ships of the Royal Navy, by J.J. Colledge, revised and updated by Lt Cdr Ben Warlow and Steve Bush, published by Seaforth Publishing, Barnsley, Great Britain, © 2020, e  (EPUB), Section S (Childs Play)

 

1680s ships
Corvettes of the Royal Navy
Naval ships of the United Kingdom